Hopi is a Uto-Aztecan language spoken by the Hopi people (a Puebloan group) of northeastern Arizona, United States.

The use of Hopi has gradually declined over the course of the 20th century. In 1990, it was estimated that more than 5,000 people could speak Hopi as a native language (approximately 75% of the population), but only 40 of them were monolingual in Hopi. The 1998 language survey of 200 Hopi people showed that 100% of Hopi elders (60 years or older) were fluent, but fluency in adults (40–59) was only 84%, 50% in young adults (20–39), and 5% in children (2–19).

Despite the apparent decline, Hopi and Navajo both are supported by bilingual education programs in Arizona, and children acquire the Native American languages as their first language. More recently, Hopi language programs for children on the reservation have been implemented.

Teaching and language revitalization efforts 

Many Hopi children are being raised in the language. A comprehensive Hopi-English dictionary edited by Emory Sekaquaptewa and others has been published, and a group, the Hopi Literacy Project, has focused its attention on promoting the language. As of 2013, "a pilot language revitalization project, the Hopi Lavayi Nest Model Program, for families with children birth through 5," is being planned for the village of Sipaulovi.

In 2004, Mesa Media, a nonprofit organization, was created to help revitalize the language.

Since 2019, more recent Hopi language revitalization programs have been reported, involving language immersion for children.

Language variation 

Benjamin Whorf identifies four varieties (dialects) of Hopi:
 First Mesa (or Whorf's Polacca)
 Mishongnovi (or Whorf's Toreva)
 Shipaulovi (or Whorf's Sipaulovi)
 Third Mesa (or Whorf's Oraibi)

First Mesa is spoken on First Mesa (which is the eastern mesa) in Polacca village in Walpi pueblo and in other neighboring communities. A community of Arizona Tewa live on First Mesa, and its members speak Tewa, in addition to a variety of Hopi and English and Spanish.

Mishongnovi is spoken on Second Mesa (which is the central mesa) in Mishongnovi village. Mishongnovi has few speakers compared to First and Third Mesa dialects. Shipaulovi is also spoken on Second Mesa in Shipaulovi village, which is close to Mishongnovi village. Whorf notes that other villages on Second Mesa are of unknown dialectal affiliation.

An introductory textbook (Kalectaca 1978) has been written by a Shongopavi speaker. Shongopavi is another village on the Second Mesa, but its relation to other dialects has not been analyzed. The Third Mesa dialect is spoken on Third Mesa (which is the western mesa) at Oraibi village and in neighboring communities, as well as in Moenkopi village, which lies off Third Mesa and at a distance west of it.

The first published analysis of the Hopi language is Benjamin Whorf's study of Mishongnovi Hopi. His work was based primarily on a single off-reservation informant, but it was later checked by other reservation speakers. In his study, he states that Mishongnovi is the most archaic and phonemically complex of the dialects. The Third Mesa dialect preserves some older relics that have been lost in Mishongnovi.

Malotki (1983) reports that Third Mesa speakers of younger generations have lost the labialization feature of w on the different subject subordinator -qw after the vowels a, i, e, u where they have -q instead. This loss of labialization is also found on the simultaneity marker where younger speakers have -kyang against older -kyangw. In words with kw or ngw in the syllable coda, the labialization is also lost: naksu (younger) vs. nakwsu (older) "he started out", hikni (younger) vs. kikwni (older) "he will drink", tuusungti (younger) vs. tuusungwti (older) "he got frozen".

Language contact 
Hopi is part of the Pueblo linguistic area (a Sprachbund) along with members of the Tanoan family, the Keresan languages, Zuni, and Navajo.

Hopi speakers have traditionally used Hopi as the language of communication with Zuni. They have also been in close contact with a Tanoan language for over 300 years since the Arizona Tewa, who speak Tewa, moved from the Galisteo Basin following the Pueblo Revolt to reside on First Mesa. The Arizona Tewa have traditionally acted as translators for the Hopi-speaking Tewa, Hopi, Navajo, Spanish, and English.

The Hopi had cursory contact with Spanish beginning with the explorers in 1540. In 1629 a small group of Franciscan missionaries started arriving in Hopi territory, building a church the following year. They remained there until 1680 when the Pueblo Revolt occurred and the Hopi expelled the Spanish from the region. Both the practices of the Spanish when there, and the stories of negative experiences of Puebloan refugees from the Rio Grande region, contributed to a Hopi attitude where acculturation was resisted or rejected.

A number of studies have focused on loanwords borrowed into Hopi from other languages.

Phonology

Vowels 

There are six basic vowels in Hopi:

{| class="wikitable" style="text-align: center;"
! rowspan="2" |
! colspan="2" | Front
! colspan="2" | Non-front
|- style="font-size: x-small;"
! unrounded || rounded
! unrounded || rounded
|-
! High
|  
|
|  
|
|-
! Mid
|  
|  
|
|  
|-
! Low
|
|
|  
|
|} /ö/ descends from Proto-Uto-Aztecan /*o/, while Hopi /o/ descends from /*u/.

Consonants 

Hopi dialects differ in their number of consonants. Below are two separate inventories of the Third Mesa and Mishongnovi dialects. The Third Mesa inventory has orthographic symbols and IPA transcriptions of those symbols when the IPA symbol differs from the orthographic symbol.

As seen above, the Mishongnovi dialect has a larger number of consonants when compared with the Third Mesa dialect. The additional consonants are a series of preaspirated stops and a series of voiceless sonorants.

Before a consonant (word-medially) and at the end of words, it is not voiced although its realization is dependent upon dialect; Third Mesa speakers have  while Mishongnovi speakers have .

In Mishongnovi,  is palatalized when at the beginning of syllables and non-palatalized elsewhere.

Hopi has a number of stop contrasts at the velar place of articulation that occur before the low vowel . Elsewhere, the contrasts are neutralized. Before , there is a phonemic contrast with fronted velar with following palatal glide and the backed velar. Complicating this pattern are words borrowed from Spanish that have a velar followed by a low vowel. With the addition of these loanwords, a third velar contrast has been introduced into Hopi. Words with this borrowed velar are "neutral" and typically velar in articulation.

This suggests that this sound is post-velar and not quite uvular.  describes the fronted sound and the sound from Spanish loanwords as palatal while the backed ones are velar.  describes the fronted form as palatal with palatal glide before some vowels, The form from Spanish loanwords as "ordinary k", and the backed form as velar. Whorf's letter to Clyde Kluckhohn in  describes the backed velar as being like Arabic or Nootka , which suggests a uvular articulation.

The fronted nasal is palatal . The backed nasal is described as velar  in Third Mesa speech and thus forms a "neutral" series with "neutral" k. In Mishongnovi speech, Whorf describes the backed nasal as having the more rear articulation of the backed dorsal: .

The retroflex sound represented with  varies between a retroflex fricative and a flap , although the fricative realization is much more common. In Mishongnovi, this sound is only weakly fricative. In syllable coda position, it is devoiced to a voiceless fricative .

The preaspirated stops  and voiceless sonorants  of Mishongnovi only occur in syllable coda position. However, they do contrast with plain stops and voiced sonorants in this position. Whorf notes that the preaspirated stops also contrast with a similar sequence of  + stop.

Orthography 

Hopi is written using the Latin alphabet.

Consonants are written:
  
  
  
  
  
  
  
  
  
  
  
  
  
  
  
  
  
  
  
  
  

Falling accent is marked with a grave : tsirò 'birds'.

To distinguish certain consonants written as digraphs from similar looking phonemes meeting across syllable boundaries, a period is used: kwaahu ('eagle') but kuk.wuwàaqe ('to follow tracks').

The Deseret alphabet, an alphabetical system developed by Mormon scholars in modern-day Utah was also used for academic notation of the language; particularly a handwritten English–Hopi dictionary made in 1860 that was rediscovered in 2014.

Syllable structure 

The most common syllable clusters are CV and CVC.

The CVCC cluster is very rare due to limited number of CC combinations in the language. This also makes it unusual to find the intrasyllabic clusters C-C and CC-C.

Stress 

The stress pattern in Hopi follows a simple rule that applies to nearly all words.
 In words with one or two vowels, the first vowel is stressed.
 Where there are more than two vowels, the first vowel is stressed if it is long or it is directly followed by two consonants. Otherwise, the second vowel is stressed.

Some exceptions to this rule are sikisve "car", wehekna "spill" and warikiwta ""running". We would expect the second vowel to be stressed but in fact the first one is stressed in these examples.

Tone 

The Third Mesa dialect of Hopi has developed tone on long vowels, diphthongs, and vowel + sonorant sequences. This dialect has either falling tones or level tones.

The falling tone (high-low) in the Third Mesa dialect corresponds to either a vowel + preaspirated consonant, a vowel + voiceless sonorant, or a vowel + h sequence in the Second Mesa dialect recorded by Whorf.

Morphology

Suffixes 

Hopi uses suffixes for a variety of purposes. Some examples are:

Hopi also has free postpositions:

Nouns are marked as oblique by either the suffixes -t for simple nouns or -y for dual nouns (those referring to exactly two individuals), possessed nouns or plural nouns.

Some examples are shown below:

Verbs are also marked by suffixes but these are not used in a regular pattern. For example, the suffixes -lawu and -ta are both used to make a simple verb into a durative one (implying the action is ongoing and not yet complete) but it is hard to predict which suffix applies to which verbs. Second language learners of Hopi usually simply learn this by rote.

There are some gender specific terms in Hopi:

Morphological processes 
 Elision – when the stress-shift would cause a clipped vowel not in the first syllable to have a low stress, that vowel is elided.
 Lenition – initial p becomes v when it becomes internal to a word or when the word is preceded by another word used as an adjectival or an incorporated verbal modifier.
 Reduplication – stem-initial CV, stem-final CV and word-final V are reduplicated.

Syntax

Word order 
The simplest type of sentence in Hopi is simply a subject and a predicate: 'Maana wuupa' (the girl is tall).

However, many Hopi sentences also include an object, which is inserted between the subject and the verb. Thus, Hopi is a subject–object–verb language.

Case 
Nouns are marked as subject or oblique, as shown above.

Pronouns are also marked as either nominative or oblique. For example, the singular subject pronoun "you" in Hopi is um, and the form for the singular object pronoun is ung.

Demonstratives are marked by case in Hopi, shown first in their nominative form and then in their oblique form:

 iˈ/it – this
 pam/put – it
 miˈ/mit – that
 ima/imuy – these
 puma/pumuy – them
 mima/mimuy – those

Number 
Hopi has plural verbs. Dual noun subjects take the dual suffix -vit but singular verbs. Hopi does not have dual pronouns; instead, the plural pronouns may be used with singular verbs for a dual meaning. Noun and verb plurality is indicated, among other devices, by partial reduplication, marked in the gloss below with a tilde (~).

Metalinguistics 

Benjamin Lee Whorf, a well-known linguist and still one of the foremost authorities on the relationships obtaining between southwestern and Central American languages, used Hopi to exemplify his argument that one's worldview is affected by one's language and vice versa. Among Whorf's best-known claims was that Hopi had "no words, grammatical forms, construction or expressions that refer directly to what we call 'time.'" Whorf's statement has been misunderstood  to mean that Hopi has no concept of duration or succession of time, but in fact, he meant only that the Hopi have no conception of time as an object or a substance that may be divided and subdivided. Furthermore, according to John A. Lucy, many of Whorf's critics have failed to read his writings accurately, preferring instead to proffer uncharitable caricatures of his arguments. The existence of temporal concepts in the Hopi language was extensively documented by Ekkehart Malotki; other linguists and philosophers are also skeptical of Whorf's broader argument and his findings on Hopi have been disputed or rejected by some.

See also 
 Hopi Dictionary: Hopìikwa Lavàytutuveni
 Qatsi trilogy

References

Sources 
 Brew, J. O. (1979). Hopi prehistory and history to 1850. In A. Ortiz (Ed.), Handbook of North American Indians: Southwest (Vol. 9, pp. 514–523). Washington, D.C.: Smithsonian Institution.
 Connelly, John C. (1979). Hopi social organization. In A. Ortiz (Ed.), Handbook of North American Indians: Southwest (Vol. 9, pp. 539–553). Washington, D.C.: Smithsonian Institution.
 
 Harrington, John P. (1913). [Linguistic fieldnotes based on work with a speaker of Oraibi Hopi]. (National Anthropological Archives, Smithsonian Institution).
 
 Hopi Dictionary Project (University of Arizona Bureau of Applied Research in Anthropology). (1998). Hopi dictionary: Hopìikwa Lavàytutuveni: A Hopi–English dictionary of the Third Mesa dialect with an English–Hopi finder list and a sketch of Hopi grammar. Tucson, Arizona: University of Arizona Press. 
 
 
 
 Kalectaca, Milo. (1978). Lessons in Hopi. Tucson, Arizona: University of Arizona Press.
 
 Kennard, Edward A.; & Albert Yava. (1999). Field Mouse Goes to War: Tusan Homichi Tuwvöta. Palmer Lake, Colorado: Filter Press.
 
 Lucy, John. (1992). Language Diversity and Thought: A Reformulation of the Linguistic Relativity Hypothesis. Cambridge University Press, Cambridge, UK
 
 
 Seaman, P. David. (1977). Hopi Linguistics: An Annotated Bibliography. Anthropological Linguistics, 19 (2), 78–97. https://www.jstor.org/stable/30027313
 Seqaquaptewa, E. (1994). Iisaw niqw tsaayantotaqam tsiròot. Santa Fe, NM: Clear Light.
 Seqaquaptewa, E. (1994). Iisaw niqw yöngösonhoya. Santa Fe, NM: Clear Light.
 Stephen, Alexander M. (1936). Hopi journal of Alexander M. Stephen. Parsons, E. C. (Ed.). Columbia University contributions to anthropology (No. 23). New York: Columbia University Press.
 
 
 Whorf, Benjamin Lee. (1936). [Notes on Hopi grammar and pronunciation; Mishongnovi forms]. In E. C. Parsons (Ed.), Hopi journal of Alexander M. Stephen (Vol. 2, pp. 1198–1326). Columbia University contributions to anthropology (No. 23). New York: Columbia University Press.
 
 
 Whorf, Benjamin Lee. (1941). The relation of habitual thought and behavior to language. In L. Spier, A. I. Hallowell, & S. S. Newman (Eds.), Language, culture, and personality: Essays in memory of Edward Sapir (pp. 75–93). Menasha, WI: Sapir Memorial Publication Fund.
 
 
 
 Whorf, Benjamin Lee. (1956). Discussion of Hopi linguistics. In J. B. Carroll (Ed.), Language, thought, and reality: Selected writings of Benjamin L. Whorf (pp. 102–111). New York: John Wiley.

External links 
 Hopi Swadesh list of basic vocabulary words (from Wiktionary's Swadesh-list appendix)
 Hopi: Survey of an Uto-Aztecan Language
 Lessons in the Hopi language by the University of Arizona Press (free downloadable PDF)
 How to count in Hopi

Hopi culture
Agglutinative languages
Northern Uto-Aztecan languages
Languages of the United States
Indigenous languages of Arizona
Indigenous languages of the Southwestern United States
Indigenous languages of the North American Southwest
Pueblo culture
Subject–object–verb languages
Native American language revitalization
Pueblo linguistic area